Korakias or Cape Korakias is a headland in northern Crete; the northwest extremity of the bay of Bali. It is identified with the ancient promontory called Dium or Dion. It has been supposed by some authors that the ancient city of Dium, spoken of by Pliny the Elder, was located near this headland.

Category

Landforms of Crete
Headlands of Greece